The Danone Hardcourt Championships  is a defunct WTA Tour affiliated women's tennis tournament played from 1987 to 1994. It was held at the Milton Tennis Centre in Brisbane in Australia and played on grass courts from 1987 to 1988 and on outdoor hard courts from 1989 to 1994.

Results

Singles

Doubles

See also
Australian Hard Court Championships

References

External links
 WTA Results Archive

 
Grass court tennis tournaments
Hard court tennis tournaments
Defunct tennis tournaments in Australia
WTA Tour
Sport in Brisbane
1987 establishments in Australia
1994 disestablishments in Australia

bg:Бризбейн Интернешънъл (мъже)
nl:WTA-toernooi van Brisbane